Lovers or Lovers? is a 1927 silent film romance drama produced and distributed by MGM and directed by John M. Stahl. It stars Ramon Novarro and Alice Terry. It is based on the 1908 play The World and His Wife and is a remake of a 1920 silent of the same name from Paramount. Lovers is a lost film.

Cast
Ramon Novarro - Jose
Alice Terry - Felicia
Edward Martindel - Don Julian
Edward Connelly - Don Severo
George K. Arthur - Pepito
Lillian Leighton - Dona Mercedes
Holmes Herbert - Milton
John Miljan - Alvarez
Roy D'Arcy - Senor Galdos

See also
The Celebrated Scandal (1915)
The World and His Wife (1920)

References

External links
 Lovers at IMDb.com
allmovie/synopsis; Lovers?
lobby poster

1927 films
1927 lost films
American silent feature films
Films directed by John M. Stahl
Metro-Goldwyn-Mayer films
American films based on plays
Lost American films
American romantic drama films
1927 romantic drama films
American black-and-white films
Lost romantic drama films
1920s American films
Silent romantic drama films
Silent American drama films